NGC 1483 is a barred spiral galaxy located in the southern constellation of Horologium and member of the Dorado Group. The nebulous galaxy features a bright central bulge and diffuse arms with distinct star-forming regions.

References

External links 
 

Barred spiral galaxies
1483
14022
Horologium (constellation)
Dorado Group